The Bangladesh national cricket team toured New Zealand in November and December 2001 and played a two-match Test series against the New Zealand national cricket team. New Zealand won both Test matches convincingly to take the series 2–0. New Zealand were captained by Stephen Fleming and Bangladesh by Khaled Mashud.

Squads

Test Series

1st Test

2nd Test

References

External links

2001 in Bangladeshi cricket
2001 in New Zealand cricket
2001
International cricket competitions in 2001–02
New Zealand cricket seasons from 2000–01